Beer Stein Markers were puppets of knitted wool used by Bavarian beer drinkers to clearly identify their tankards when sent back for refilling. The puppets were usually about 10cm high and fixed to the thumbpiece on the lid. Traditionally they were caricatures of politicians of the time, both popular and unpopular. The custom was particularly to be seen at the Löwenbräukeller in Munich during the 1890s. 

In his 1897 article on beer-markers George Dollar wrote that the "beer-marker" custom has been known to Munich for many years, and that it has been adopted in nearly all of the German cities and towns. In the Löwenbräu Keller the markers are sold for fifty pfennige, or sixpence, each, by an old woman who goes round amongst the beer-drinkers with a basket. She is a well-known character in Munich, and knits the figures herself.

A more modern solution is to affix a brightly coloured plastic token to beer bottles at social gatherings and thereby to prevent confusion.

References

Beer vessels and serving
Beer in Germany
German beer culture